Robert Worby is a London-based composer, sound artist, writer and broadcaster.

In the late 1970s, he played guitar and tapes in a post-punk band called The Distributors. The band released several singles, recorded two Radio 1 sessions for John Peel and played regularly with This Heat, The Raincoats and other bands of that era.

In the 1980s, Worby received awards from the Arts Council of Great Britain to work as a composer and undertake a number of residencies. At this time he also worked with The Mekons. In 1989, he was invited to work with John Cage, at the Huddersfield Contemporary Music Festival.

In 1994, he began assisting the composer Michael Nyman working on several films, concert music and the opera Facing Goya.

In the mid 1990s, Worby began broadcasting on Radio 3 presenting a five-part series entitled Cacophony Now! that explored how dissonance and noise, interface with contemporary music. Most recently, he has been a regular presenter of Hear and Now, the BBC's main contemporary music programme. In addition, Worby has made several features on subjects including the work of Daphne Oram, the founder of the BBC Radiophonic Workshop, and the music of Luigi Russolo. Along with colleagues from the BBC and Sonic Arts Network,  Worby founded the Cut & Splice festival of electronic music and sound art in 2002.

External links
Robert Worby Official Website
BBC Official page on Robert Worby 

English composers
English writers
Living people
English radio presenters
The Mekons members
Year of birth missing (living people)